Kozhikkode Lighthouse is a defunct light in the Kozhikkode District of Kerala. It was constructed in 1907. Kozhikode or Calicut lighthouse is automated, and an LED flasher apparatus is in use.

History 
In 1847, a  tower was erected using stones in lime mortar. The light was a fixed one with wick lamp using coconut oil, and a metal reflector was placed on the back of it. The light was improved in 1881 using a fourth-order fixed optic transferred from Armagon lighthouse. Mr. Ashpitel, an engineer with the Public works department, who was deputed to study on lighthouses in Madras Presidency in 1885, recommended the height of the tower be reduced to improve the efficiency of light. Further modifications were done in 1924 by converting the light to a flashing one using acetylene gas flasher. The light was converted to LED flashing light using solar energy in 2008.

See also 

 List of lighthouses in India

References

External links 

 
 Directorate General of Lighthouses and Lightships

Lighthouses in Kerala
Buildings and structures in Kozhikode
Transport in Kozhikode
Lighthouses completed in 1907
1907 establishments in India